Ivy Latimer (born 1 December 1994) is an Australian actor best known for portraying the mermaid Nixie on the television series Mako: Island of Secrets.

Early life and education 
Latimer was born on 1 December 1994 in Ventura, California, U.S.A.. Latimer's family moved to Newcastle, New South Wales at six years old.

Latimer attended the Hunter School of Performing Arts in Broadmeadow, in Newcastle.

Acting career
From 2002 to 2003, Latimer was guest star on White Collar Blue, portraying the character Lel.

From 2004 to 2006, Latimer appeared in seven episodes of the TV show Love My Way as Ashley McClusky, and from 2010 to 2011 portrayed Angela Carlson in the series Me and My Monsters.

In 2007, Latimer participated in the amateur film festival Shoot Out along with some classmates, winning second place in the category under 18.

In May 2012, Latimer landed the role of Nixie, one of the lead mermaid roles in season 1 of Mako: Island of Secrets, a spin-off of H2O: Just Add Water.

In July 2014, Latimer hosted the television series Studio 3.

Filmography

References 

1994 births
Living people
21st-century Australian actresses
Australian child actresses
Australian film actresses
Australian television actresses